Hillbilly Hot Dogs is a roadside hot dog stand and tourist attraction located near Huntington, West Virginia known for gourmet hot dogs and hamburgers.

Menu
Its offerings include the Homewrecker Hot Dog, which is 15 inches long and "contains three and a half pounds of deep fried sausage and a deep fried one pound weenie topped with sauteed peppers and onion, two kinds of cheese, lettuce, tomatoes, jalapeños, spicy sauce, mustard, ketchup and creamy slaw." It is promoted with an "eat it all in 12 minutes, get a t-shirt and braggin' right" deal. It also sells a 15-pound burger consisting of ten pounds of meat, five pounds of bun, cheese, ketchup, mustard, onions, pickles, tomatoes, and mayonnaise.

Hillbilly Hot Dogs' 10-Pound Burger has been ranked among America's fattiest foods.

Hillbilly Hot Dogs was featured on Food Network's Diners, Drive Ins, and Dives in 2008 on their Flavortown Favorites Episode and two more times in 2010 and 2020.

See also
 List of hot dog restaurants

References

External links
 

Theme restaurants
Restaurants in West Virginia
Hot dog restaurants in the United States
1999 establishments in West Virginia